The grammar of Ukrainian (Ukrainian: Граматика української мови) describes its phonological, morphological, and syntactic rules. Ukrainian has seven cases and two numbers for its nominal declension and two aspects, three tenses, three moods, and two voices for its verbal conjugation. Adjectives agree in number, gender, and case with their nouns.

To understand Ukrainian grammar, it is necessary to understand the various phonological rules that occur due to sequences of two or more sounds. This markedly decreases the number of exceptions and makes understanding the rules better. The origin of some of these phonological rules can be traced all the way back to Indo-European gradation (ablaut). This is especially common in explaining the differences between the infinitive and present stems of many verbs.

This article presents the grammar of standard Ukrainian, which is followed by most dialects. The main differences in the dialects are vocabulary with occasional differences in phonology and morphology. Further information can be found in the article Ukrainian dialects.

Grammatical terminology 
The following is a list of Ukrainian terms for properties and morphological categories, with their English translations or equivalents:

Phonology 
The following points of Ukrainian phonology need to be considered to understand the grammar of Ukrainian.

Classification of vowels 
Two different classifications of vowels can be made: a historical perspective and a modern perspective. From a historical perspective, the Ukrainian vowels can be divided into two categories:
 Hard vowels (in Cyrillic: а, и (from Common Slavic *ы), о, and у or transliterated as a, y (from Common Slavic *y), o, and u)
 Soft vowels (in Cyrillic: е, і and и (from Common Slavic *и) or transliterated as e, i and y (from Common Slavic *i)). The iotified vowels are considered to be soft vowels
From a modern perspective, the Ukrainian vowels can be divided into two categories:
 Hard Vowels (In Cyrillic: а, е, и, і, о, and у or transliterated as a, e, y, i, o, and u). This category as can be seen from the table is different from the historical hard category
 Iotified Vowel (In Cyrillic: я, є, ї, and ю or transliterated as ya, ye, yi, and yu). To this category can also be added the combination of letters йо/ьо (transliterated as yo)

Classification of consonants 
In Ukrainian, consonants can be categorized as follows:
 Labials (in Cyrillic: б, в, м, п, and ф or transliterated as b, v, m, p, and f) are almost always hard in Ukrainian (there are orthographic exceptions), can never be doubled or in general be followed by an iotified vowel (exception: in combinations CL where C is a dental and L is a labial, a soft vowel can follow, e.g., sviato/свято).
 Post-alveolar sibilants (in Cyrillic: ж, ч, and ш or transliterated as zh, sh, and sh. The digraph щ (shch) should also be included) were in Common Slavic all palatal (soft). They hardened in Ukrainian, leading to the creation of the mixed declension of nouns. They can't be followed by a soft sign (in Cyrillic: ь; transliterated as apostrophe (’)) or any iotified vowel. All but the digraph щ can be doubled, in which case they can be followed by a soft vowel, e.g., zbízhzhia/збі́жжя.
 Dentals (in Cyrillic: д, з, л, н, с, т and ц or transliterated as d, z, l, n, s, t, and ts) can be both hard and soft in Ukrainian, as in Common Slavic. These letters can never (unless they are the last letter in a prefix) be followed by an apostrophe. Furthermore, these letters can be doubled.
 Alveolar (in Cyrillic: р or transliterated as r) can be either hard or soft but is always hard at the end of a syllable. Therefore, r is always hard at the end of a word and is never followed by a soft sign. r can never be doubled, except in foreign words (such as сюрреалізм).
 Velars (in Cyrillic: г, ґ, к, and х or transliterated as h, g, k, and kh) are always hard in both Ukrainian and Common Slavic. If an iotified or soft vowel are to follow them, they undergo the first and second palatalizations. Hence, these letters can never be doubled or followed by an apostrophe.

Historical changes 
In Ukrainian, the following sound changes have occurred between the Common Slavic period and current Ukrainian:

 In a newly closed syllable, that is, a syllable that ends in a consonant, Common Slavic o and e mutate into i if the next vowel in Common Slavic was one of the yers (ь/ĭ and ъ/ŭ).
 Pleophony: The Common Slavic combinations, ToRT and TeRT, where T is any consonant and R is either r or l become in Ukrainian.
 TorT gives ToroT (Common Slavic *borda gives Ukrainian borodá)
 TolT gives ToloT (Common Slavic *bolto gives Ukrainian bolóto)
 TerT gives TereT (Common Slavic *berza gives Ukrainian beréza)
 TelT gives ToloT (Common Slavic *melko gives Ukrainian molokó)
 The Common Slavic nasal vowel ę, derived from an Indo-European *-en, *-em, or one of the sonorants n and m, is reflected as ya except after a single labial where it is reflected as ″ya (’я), or after a post-alveolar sibilant where it is reflected as a. For example,
 Common Slavic *pętь gives in Ukrainian p″iat''' (п’ять);
 Common Slavic *telę gives in Ukrainian teliá (теля́); and
 Common Slavic kurčę gives in Ukrainian kurchá (курча́).The Common Slavic letter, ě (ѣ), is reflected in Ukrainian generally as i except:
 word-initially, where it is reflected as yi: Common Slavic *ěsti gives the Ukrainian yísty (ї́сти)
 after the post-alveolar sibilants where it is reflected as a: Common Slavic *ležěti gives the Ukrainian lezháty (лежа́ти)
 Common Slavic i and y are both reflected in Ukrainian as y The Common Slavic combination -CьjV, where C is any consonant and V is any vowel, becomes in Ukrainian the following combination -CCjV, except
 if C is labial or 'r' where it becomes -C"jV if V is the Common Slavic e, then the vowel in Ukrainian mutates to a, e.g., Common Slavic *žitьje gives the Ukrainian zhyttiа́ (життя́)
 if V is the Common Slavic ь, then the combination becomes ei, e.g., genitive plural in Common Slavic *myšьjь gives the Ukrainian myshei (мише́й)
 if one or more consonants precede the C then there is no doubling of the consonants in Ukrainian
 Common Slavic combinations dl and tl are simplified to l, for example, Common Slavic *mydlo gives Ukrainian mýlo (ми́ло)
 Common Slavic ъl and ьl became ov, while word final lъ became v. For example, Common Slavic *vьlkъ becomes vovk (вовк) in Ukrainian

 Current changes 
 The first palatalization concerns the velars and the following vowels: e, y from Common Slavic i, a/i from Common Slavic ě, derived from the Indo-European ē. Before these vowels,
 h/g mutates into zh.
 k mutates into ch.
 kh mutates into sh.
 The second palatalization concerns the velars and the following vowels: y from Common Slavic i that is derived from an Indo-European diphthong and a/i from Common Slavic ě, derived from an Indo-European diphthong. Before these vowels,
 h/g mutates into z.
 k mutates into ts.
 kh mutates into s.
 The iotification concerns all consonants and the semi-vowel y (й). The following changes occur:
 The labials insert an l between the labial and the semivowel: Common Slavic *zemja give Ukrainian zemliá (земля́).
 The velars followed by a semivowel mutate as in the first palatalization. The semivowel is dropped. This change can be traced back to Common Slavic.
 kt', t becomes ch
 d becomes zh, except in verbs where it becomes dzh
 s becomes sh
 st', sk''' become shch (щ)
 zd', zh become zhdzh zk becomes zhch l, n, r becomes l', n', r (that is, ль, нь, рь)
 In Ukrainian, when two or more consonants occur word-finally, then a float vowel is inserted under the following conditions. Given a consonantal grouping C1(ь)C2(ь), where C is any Ukrainian consonant. The fill vowel is inserted between the two consonants and after the ь. A fill vowel is only inserted if C2 is one of the following consonants: k, v, l, m, r, n, and ts. In this case:
 If C1 is one of the following h, k, or kh, then the fill vowel is always o
 If C2 is k or v, then the fill vowel is o. No fill vowel is inserted if the v is derived from a voiced l, for example, vovk
 If C2 is l, m, r, or c, then the fill vowel is e
 The only known exception is vid′om, which should take e as the fill vowel, but instead adds an o.
 The combinations, -stv and -s′k are not broken up
 If the C1 is y (й), then the above rules can apply. However, both forms (with and without the fill vowel) often exist

Assimilation 
The following assimilations occur:
Before the с of a suffix (-ський or -ство)
If the root ends in г (ґ), ж, or з, then it mutates to з and the с of the suffix is lost.
If the root ends in к, ч, or ц, then it mutates to ц and the с of the suffix is lost.
If the root ends in х, с, or ш, then it mutates to с and the с of the suffix is lost (or the last letter of the root drops out).
The following combinations of letters change:
{ж, з} + дн is contracted to {ж, з} + н.
ст + {л, н} is contracted to с + {л, н}.
{п, р} + тн is contracted to {п, р} + н.
{с, к} + кн is contracted to {с, к} + н.

Dissimilation 
The most common dissimilation (dating back to Proto-Slavic) is encountered in the infinitive of verbs, where {д, т} + т dissimilates to ст, for example, крад + ти gives красти and плет + ти gives плести.

Morphology

Nominal

Nouns 
The nominal declension has seven cases (nominative, genitive, dative, accusative, instrumental, locative, and vocative), in two numbers (singular and plural), and absolutely obeying grammatical gender (masculine, feminine and neuter). Adjectives, pronouns, and the first two cardinal numbers have gender specific forms.

A third number, the dual, also existed in Old East Slavic, but except for its use in the nominative and accusative cases with the numbers two, three and four, e.g. dvi hryvni/дві гривні vs. dvoie hryven'/двоє гривень (recategorized today as a nominative plural), it has been lost. Other traces of the dual can be found when referring to objects of which are commonly in pairs: eyes, shoulders, ears, e.g. plechyma. Occasionally, dual forms can distinguish between meanings.

In Ukrainian, there are 4 declension types. The first declension is used for most feminine nouns. The second declension is used for most masculine and neuter nouns. The third declension is used for feminine nouns ending in ь or a post-alveolar sibilant. The fourth declension is used for neuter nouns ending in я/а (Common Slavic *ę).

Most of the types consist of 3 different subgroups: hard, mixed, and soft. The soft subgroup consists of nouns whose roots end in a soft letter (followed by iotified vowel or soft vowel). The mixed subgroup consists of the nouns whose roots end in a post-alveolar sibilant or occasionally r. The hard group consists of all other nouns.

If the hard group endings are taken as the basis, then the following rules can be used to derive the corresponding mixed and soft endings:
Mixed subgroup: Following a post-alveolar sibilant,
 All о change to е
 All и change to і
Soft subgroup: Whenever a soft sign or the semi-vowel encounters the vowel of the ending, the following changes occur (These are mainly orthographic changes, but same can be traced to similar changes in Common Slavic):
 ьа or йа gives я
 ьо gives е
 йе gives є
 ьи gives і
 йи gives ї
 ьу or йу gives ю
 ьі gives і
 йі gives ї

Nouns ending in a consonant are marked in the following tables with ∅ (no ending).

First declension 

This declension consists of nouns that end in а or я. It consists primarily of feminine nouns, but a few nouns with these ending referring to professions can be either masculine or feminine. In these cases, the genitive plural is often formed by adding -ів. Nouns referring to people can also take this ending.

(1) A velar consonant undergoes the appropriate second palatalization changes
(2) If two or more consonants are left at the end of the word, then a fill vowel may be inserted.
(3) The genitive form is used for all animate nouns, while inanimate nouns take the nominative form.

Second declension 
The second declension consists of masculine and neuter nouns.

Masculine nouns: This group consists primarily of nouns ending in a consonant, a soft sign ь, or й. In this declension, nouns ending in р can belong to any of the three declension subgroups: hard, mixed, and soft. There is no way of knowing from the nominative form alone to which group the noun belongs.

Notes:
(1) Only with soft nouns ending in р.
(2) The ending to be used depends on the nature of the noun. The following rules are given in Ukrainian Orthography:
Use the ending -а with
 Names of professions, people’s names (first and last)
 Names of plants and animals
 Names of objects
 Names of settlements and geographic places
 Names of measuring units
 Names of machines
 Words of foreign origin, which describe geometric parts, concrete objects.
Use the ending -у with
 Chemical elements, materials (note a few exceptions)
 Collective nouns
 Names of buildings and their parts
 Names of organizations and their places
 Natural phenomena
 Feelings
 Names of processes, states, phenomena of social life (both concrete and abstract)
 Names of foreign origin that denote physical or chemical processes
 Names of games and dances
(3) The ending in -ові is preferred.
(4) The accusative case for animate nouns is identical to the genitive case; for inanimate nouns, it is identical to the nominative.
(5) Velar-root nouns generally take the -у ending, thus avoiding the second palatalization. For non-velar roots, both -і and -ові types are acceptable. As usual, the -і ending triggers the second palatalization.
(6) If the ending -е is used, then the first palatalization occurs. However, it can be avoided by using the -у form.
(7) The second ending occurs is a small group of nouns.
(8) The genitive form is used with animate objects, while inanimate objects take the nominative forms.

Neuter nouns: This category consists of neuter nouns ending in о, е, and substantives ending in я, preceded by either a double consonant, apostrophe, or two consonants, which primarily are derived from verbs. This last category once did end in *ĭjе, but due to the sound change given above developed an я ending.

(1) As necessary, the second palatalization occurs, except for the *ĭjе nouns.
(2) The double consonant is made single if the ь is used. However, if a post-alveolar sibilant is the last consonant, then no ь is used, but a single consonant is also written. For a labial final consonant, the ending is -’їв. Finally, monosyllabic nouns take the ending -ів. If two or more consonants appear word finally, then it is possible that a fill vowel must be inserted.

Third declension 
This declension consists solely of feminine nouns that end in a consonant. This declension has only 2 subgroups: a mixed and soft group.

(1) Since this ending is derived from the Common Slavic ending *-ĭjǫ, doubling of the consonant occurs as per the rules outlined above. Furthermore, if in the nominative form the noun has an -і for an -о, then so will the instrumental form, for example, ніччю (instrumental singular) and ніч (nominative singular)

Fourth declension 
This declension consists of solely neuter nouns that are derived from Common Slavic *ę. There are two subgroups: those with an н insert, and those with a т insert.

Adjectives 
Ukrainian adjectives agree with the nouns they modify in gender, number, and case.

In Ukrainian, there exist a small number of adjectives, primarily possessives, which exist in the masculine in the so-called short form. This "short" form is a relic of the indefinite declension of adjectives in Common Slavic. Common examples of this anomalous declension are бабин (masculine) compared to бабина (feminine); братів (masculine) compared to братова (feminine); and повинен (masculine) compared to повинна. This short form only exists in the masculine nominative form. All other forms are regular.

Declension 
In Ukrainian, for adjectives there are 2 different declension types: hard and soft. The soft type can be further subdivided into two types. Unlike for the nouns, the post-alveolar sibilants are counted as hard. There also exists a special mixed declension for adjectives ending in -лиций. These adjectives are derived from the noun лице, describing types of faces, for example, білолиций.

Note about the declensions:

(1) In the accusative case (except the feminine singular), a difference is made between animate (genitive) and inanimate (nominative) adjectives.
(2) The ending in -ому is more often encountered. The other form is a relic of the indefinite declension of adjectives in Common Slavic.

Other forms of the adjective 
In Ukrainian adjectives also have comparative and superlative forms.

The comparative form is created by dropping ий and adding the ending -(і)ший. The resulting form is declined like a regular hard stem adjective. As usual, some adjectives have irregular forms.

The superlative form is created by prefixing най- to the comparative form. Words associated with religion often prefix пре- (very) to the comparative form. As usual, some adjectives have irregular forms.

Adverbs 
In Ukrainian, adverbs are formed by taking the stem of the adjective (that is dropping the −а from the feminine nominative singular form; forms ending in −я are replaced by −ьа (after consonants) or −йа (after vowels), before dropping the −а) and adding the ending
 -о, is the general ending,
 -е, can be used for some stems that are hard (no ь or й at the end), for example, добре from добрий. This is very common for the comparative form of the adjective.

For example, гарний gives гарно. The comparative and superlative forms of an adverb are formed by taking the corresponding form of the adjective and replacing −ий by -е, for example, гарніше from гарніший.

Adverbs can also be derived from the locative or instrumental singular of a noun, for example, ввечері (from в plus the locative of вечера), нагорі (from на plus the locative of гора).

Pronouns

Personal pronouns 
The personal pronouns are declined as follows.

Demonstrative pronouns 
The demonstrative pronouns той (that) and цей (this) are declined as follows.

Possessive pronouns 
The first (мій) and second person (твій) singular possessive pronouns are declined similarly as can be seen from the table below.

The first (наш) and second (ваш) person plural possessive pronouns are declined as below. The masculine nominative forms are the short forms.

The third person plural possessive pronoun, їхній, is declined as a normal soft adjective.

Interrogative pronouns 
The interrogative pronouns, хто and що, are declined as follows.

The interrogative pronoun, чий, is declined as given in the table below.

Numbers 
(The "Adverbial" column corresponds to English once, twice, thrice, four times, etc.)

Comments:
(1) Any soft signs are dropped if they occur word finally in the original cardinal number.
(2) This is a dual construction.
(3) This is a plural nominative construction.
(4) This is the genitive plural construction (all hundreds after 500 are created so).

In general, the following rules are used to determine agreement between the cardinal number and a noun. In the nominative case, the nouns agree with the last number in any compound number. Nouns that must agree with a number ending in 2, 3, or 4 are in the nominative plural, but retain the stress of the dual, that is the genitive singular. Nouns, which must agree with a number ending in 5, 6, 7, 8, 9, 0, and all the teens are in the genitive plural. In any other case, the nouns and numbers are in the same case.

Verbs 
Grammatical conjugation is subject to three persons in two numbers and three simple tenses (present/future, future, and past), with periphrastic forms for the future and Conditional, as well as imperative forms and present/past participles, distinguished by adjectival and adverbial usage. There are two voices, active and middle/passive, which is constructed by the addition of a reflexive suffix -ся/сь to the active form. An interesting feature is that the past tense is actually made to agree in gender with the subject, for it is the participle in an originally periphrastic perfect formed with the present of быть (modern: бути) , "to be". Verbal inflection today is considerably simpler than in Common Slavic. The ancient aorist, imperfect, and (periphrastic) pluperfect have been lost. The loss of three of the former six tenses has been offset by the reliance, as in other Slavic languages, on verbal aspect. Most verbs come in pairs, one with imperfective or continuous connotation, the other with perfective or completed, usually formed with a (prepositional) prefix, but occasionally using a different root.

The present tense of the verb бути, "to be", today normally has the form, є used for all persons and numbers. Previously (before 1500) and occasionally in liturgical settings, aspects of the full conjugation, can be found. The paradigm shows as well as anything else the Indo-European affinity of Ukrainian:

Note: Ukrainian forms followed by * are considered archaic in Standard Ukrainian (albeit those are still used in dialects) and are replaced by є. In the present tense, the verb бути is often omitted (or replaced by a dash "—" in writing), for example, "Мій брат — вчитель" ("My brother is a teacher"). "—" is not used when the subject is a pronoun, "Я студент" ("I am a student").

Classification of verbs 
There exist two different classification of verbs: traditional and historical/linguistic.

The traditional classification of verbs subdivides the verbs into two categories based on the form of the 3rd person singular present indicative form of the verb.
 The е stems, which have the ending -е or -є in the 3rd person singular.
 The и stems, which have the ending -ить in the 3rd person singular.

The historical/linguistic classification of verbs subdivides the verbs into 5 categories. Classes 1, 2 and 3 correspond to the е stems of the traditional classification, while class 4 corresponds to the и stems. Class 5 consists of the athematic verbs.

 Class 1: Stems in -е
 The same stem in the Present and the Infinitive
 The same consonantal stem (the last three examples do not quite resemble the first example or the classification name due to various sound changes (palatalization) in Ukrainian):
нести / несе
пекти / пече
умерти / умре
почати / почне
 The same vowel stem
плисти / пливе
 Infinitive in -ати
 Consonantal stem
 брати / бере
 Vowel stems
 рвати / рве
 Class 2: "n" verbs (mostly perfective verbs)
 двигнути / двигне
 Class 3: Presents in є (undergo changes associated with iotification)
 Primary verbs
 Same stem in the Present and Infinitive
 Same vowel stem
 знати / знає
 Same consonantal stem (these stem often have a pleophonic form for the infinitive)
 молоти (Common Slavic *melti) / меле (мелю)
 полоти (Common Slavic *polti) / поле (полю)
 Infinitive in -ати
 Same vowel stem (-я)
 сіяти / сіє
 Same consonantal stem
 орати / оре (орю)
 Stems that undergo the changes associated with the doubling of the consonants (the result is slightly regularized in that -ĭje does not mutate into -я as would be expected)
 бити: б’ю, б’єш ... (Common Slavic: *biti: bĭjǫ, bĭješĭ ...)
 пити
 лити: ллю, ллєш ...
 Derived Verbs (all vowel stems)
 a-stems
 думати / думає
 ě-stems
 жовтіти / жовтіє
 uva-stems
 купувати / купує
 Class 4: i-stems in the Present (undergo changes associated with iotification)
i-stems in both the Present and Infinitive
 хвалити / хвалить
 ě-stems
вертіти / вертить
лежати / лежить
 Class 5: Athematic Verbs (-m presents)
 їсти
 дати
 -вісти
 бути

Voice 
Ukrainian has 2 voices: (1) active voice and (2) passive voice. The active voice is the only voice with a complete set of conjugations. The active voice, in general, shows a direct effect of the verb on its subject.

Indicative active mood 
The indicative mood is used to describe events, which have occurred, are occurring, or will occur. In Ukrainian, the indicative mood contains the present, future, and past tenses.

Present tense 
Historically, this is derived from the Indo-European present tense. In Common Slavic and later Ukrainian, it retained its present meaning only for imperfective verbs and developed a future meaning for perfective verbs.

For the е stems (Classes 1, 2, and 3), the endings are:

All verbs whose roots end in a velar undergo the first palatalization in all forms of the present (even though historically speaking the first person singular should not). The endings in є are used for roots whose stem ends in a vowel. All verbs in Class 3 and those that end in a vowel use -ю and -ють. Furthermore, Class 3 verbs undergo iotification in those forms that use -ю-. For reflexive verbs, in the third person singular, the ending has its historical -ть restored before the participle -ся/-сь is affixed. Thus, the ending becomes -еться.

For the и stems (Class 4), the endings are:

All Class 4 verbs undergo iotification in the first person singular. Thus, there is really only one ending, which due to orthographic reasons is given 2 different forms. Verbs ending in a vowel take the endings in the second column. In the third person plural, verbs ending in a labial insert an л before the ending, -ять. The ending -ать is used after the sibilants ж, ш, щ, or ч.

Examples

Athematic verbs 
Ukrainian inherited from Indo-European through Common Slavic, the following 3 athematic verbs. These verbs have their own conjugation in the present. Everywhere else they are regular.

Past active tense 
The past tense in Ukrainian has the peculiarity of being originally an adjective, since it derives from the original compound perfect (corresponding to, for example, the Latin first conjugation participle ending -atus). Thus, the past tense agrees in number and gender (but not person) with the subject of the verb. The following endings are added to the infinitive with the ending -ти removed (Most root final д and т are dropped):

masculine singular: -в
Note: It is lost after с, з, к, г, б, р.
Note 2: Stems ending in е or о plus a consonant convert them to і, for example, ніс but несла and міг but могла. Stems in я plus a consonant can also undergo this change.
feminine singular: -ла
neuter singular: -ло
plural: -ли

Class 2 verbs can have forms without the −ну, for example, заслабнути has the forms заслаб, заслабла, заслабло, and заслабли. Not all Class 2 verbs undergo this change.

These forms are often called the active past participle I. The masculine singular evolved from an earlier *-лъ that vocalized.

Future active tense 
In Ukrainian, there are 2 different future tenses for imperfective verbs. The first form, called simple (проста форма), formed by adding to the infinitive of the verb the following endings, which are derived from the Common Slavic verb *jęti (Present stem: jĭm−):

The second form, called compound (складена форма), is to take the present tense conjugation of the verb бути and use it with the infinitive of the verb. Thus,

This will translate as will eat with the appropriate personal pronoun.

The two forms do not differ in function or semantics. However, the compound form tends to be used more often, and is the only way to form a future of the verb бути.

Imperative active mood 
The imperative mood is used to give commands. It exists in only the present tense in Ukrainian. There are no forms for the 1st person singular.
In Ukrainian, the imperative mood is formed from the present stem of the verb plus the following endings (The example is based on Ukrainian пити):

The first set of endings is to be used for stems that end in a dentals (з, д, т, с, н, and л). The second set of ending is used for stems that end in a vowel. The third set of endings is used for stems that end in labials or post-alveolar sibilants (б, в, м, п, ф, ш, щ, ч, ж, and р). The fourth set of endings is used with verbs whose unaffixed form (no prefixes or suffixes) have the stress on the ending in the first person singular of the present tense. As well, most Class 2 verbs and those verb roots ending in a consonant plus л or р take these endings. Thus for example, бери and вибери. Class 5 verbs take the first set of endings, but undergo an archaic form of iotation, so that дь becomes ж (rather than дж), for example, їжте < їд+ьте. This does not apply to дати, which is treated as a regular verb with a stem in да-.

Finally note that all verbs with stems that end in к and г undergo the first palatalization. Class 3 verbs with stems in к, г, and с undergo iotification (as do their present conjugation).

Conditional active mood 
The conditional mood is used to state hypothetical states, wishes, and desires. It has 2 tenses in Ukrainian: a present and a past.

Present tense 
The present conditional is formed in Ukrainian from the participle би or the short form б, which is derived from the archaic aorist conjugation of the verb, бути, and the active past participle I, which is the same as the past indicative participle. Thus, there is agreement between the subject and the participle. An example of this construction would be я би хотів ... (I would like...).

Past tense 
The past conditional is formed in Ukrainian from the participle би or the short form б followed by the active past participle I form of the verb бути (був, була, було, були) and then the active past participle I of the verb. Both participles must agree with the subject. An example of this construction would be як я би був знав... (had I known...). Alternatively, the past conditional can be formed by using the form якби and the active past participle I form of the verb, for example, якби я знав.

Passive voice 
The passive voice has 2 different functions. It shows either that the subject has had something done to itself or that something indeterminate has occurred to the subject.
In Ukrainian, the passive voice is formed as follows:
 Use of a reflexive verb: митися (to wash oneself or in French se laver)
 Use of the verb to be and the past passive participle: Він був вбитий (He was killed).
 An impersonal use of the third person plural past active participle I: Його вбили (He was killed).
 The following construction: Було + neuter singular of past passive participle, the "-но/-то" form: Місто було захоплене (The town was captured.).

Participles and verbal nouns 

In Ukrainian, there exist traces of all five Common Slavic participles.

Present active participle 

This participle is formed by taking the third person plural form, dropping the ть, and adding чи(й). Most commonly this participle is used as gerund with the form чи with a meaning approaching the equivalent English construction with -ing. Occasionally, it is used as an adjective. In this case its form is чий. Examples of this participle are несучи, знаючи, and хвалячи.

Present passive participle 

This participle does not exist in Ukrainian as a separate form. However, it is commonly encountered as an adjective in -мий. Common examples of this participle are відомий and знайомий.

Past active participle I 

This participle is encountered in forming the past tense in Ukrainian. Occasionally, it is found as an adjective for intransitive verbs. It is formed by taking the infinitive stem and adding the ending -в, -ла, -ло, and -ли to form the past tense participle (in reality the indefinite form of the adjective) and the ending -лий to form the regular adjective. An example of the adjectival form is почорнілий.

Past active participle II 

This participle is most commonly encountered as a gerund, while it is only used occasionally as an adjective. It is formed by taking the masculine past participle I and adding the ending -ши(й). An example of the gerund is знавши, while a common (dialectical) adjective would be the word бувший.

Past passive participle 

The past passive participle is the only participle used commonly as an adjective. There are two parallel forms with no difference in meaning: in -тий or in -ний. This participle is formed from the infinitive stem for most verbs. Class 2 verbs can as for other participles drop the suffix ну or only the у, for example, движений from двигнути. Verbs in -ува́ти or -юва́ти (those whose ending is stressed) will replace the у by о and ю by ь/йо (ь if a consonant precedes or й if a vowel), for example, мальо́ваний from малюва́ти. Finally, Class 3 stems with full voicing have two possible stems: the first is simply obtained by dropping the −ти from the infinitive, while the second is obtained by dropping the last three letters (which in effect means using the present form). The first form will take the −тий ending, while the second form will take the −ний ending, for example полоти has полотий and полений. Note that the verb молоти has the second form мелений, since it derives from *melti in Common Slavonic). The ending is determined as follows:
If the stem ends in a vowel or ер or ор (derived from a sonant r in Common Slavonic), then
If the vowel is и, у, я a sibilant plus а, ер, or ор then add -тий, for example, розп’ятий, тертий, or жатий.
For class 3 verbs with full voicing ending in о, then add -тий, for example, поротий.
For all Class 4 verbs, the ending is -єний, for example, гоєний.
Otherwise, the ending is -ний.
If the stem ends in a consonant, then add -ений. Class 1 verbs undergo the first palatalization, while Class 2, 4, and 5 verbs undergo iotation, for example, печений, тиснений, ораний, лишений, люблений, and їджений.

Verbal noun 

The verbal noun is created by taking the past passive participle, dropping ий, doubling the consonant if permitted by the rules under -ĭjV, and adding a я. This will be a neuter noun declined like all neuter nouns in *ĭjе. If the -е- of the past passive participle is stressed then the е will mutate into an і. Examples include питання from питати and носіння from носити. Note that any Class 3 verbs in -увати or -ювати will restore the у or ю малювання from мальований (малювати)

The verbal noun in Ukrainian is derived from the Common Slavic verbal noun, where it was formed by adding *-ĭjе to the past passive participle without the *ŭ ending. Thus, in Ukrainian, the consonant is doubled if possible.

Word formation 
Ukrainian has a rich set of prefixes, both prepositional and adverbial in nature, as well as diminutive, augmentative, and frequentative suffixes. All of these can be stacked one upon the other, to produce multiple derivatives of a given word. Participles and other inflectional forms may also have a special connotation. For example, the word напіввідкритий can be split into the following prefixes and suffixes:

Prefixes 
In Ukrainian, prefixes can be added to a root and stacked on top of each as in the above example. The most common prefixes are given in the table below. Although the prefixes have the given meaning, when attached to a root, it is possible that the resulting new word will have a unique meaning that is distantly related to the original meaning of the prefix. If possible the example is given using the verbal root ходити or the nominal root хід.

(1) The multitude of forms in Ukrainian for the Common Slavic *sŭ(n) (*съ(н)) and *jǐz- is a result of the fact that their s and z could assimilate (or dissimilate) with the root's initial consonants. As well, since a ь followed, there was the potential for further sound changes. Finally, words entered Ukrainian from different Slavic languages with their own peculiarities or that the origin of the word was lost. The following are examples of all the given possibilities:
збирати < *събирати
спекти for *съпечи
зіпріти for *съпрѣти
ізнов
іспит < jьсъпытъ
зошит for *съшитъ = bound/sown together
зустріч for *съсрѣчь
сусід < *сѫсѣдъ < *сън- + *сѣдъ = sit together
союз for OCS *съѭзь = yoke together

In Ukrainian, the normal form is з except before к, п, т, ф and х where the normal form is с.

The following rules are followed when adding a prefix to the root:
 If the prefix ends in a consonant and the root starts with an iotified vowel, then an apostrophe is added between the prefix and the root, for example, з'їсти.
 If a prefix ends in a consonant and the root starts with two or more consonants, then the vowel і is inserted between the prefix and the root, for example, розібрати. This does not apply to the prefix в, for example, вбрати.

Suffixes 
In Ukrainian, suffixes can be added to a root and stacked on top of each to produce a family of words. The most common suffixes are given in the table below. The curly brackets {} denote the various possible different suffixes with a similar meaning

Adjectives 
Two or more adjectives can be combined into a single word using an о as the linking vowel, for example, сільськогосподарський, which consists of the adjectives сільський and господарський. If the second adjective starts with a vowel, then a dash can be used to separate the linking vowel and the second adjective, for example, середньо-європейський.

Verbs 
In addition to the suffixes and prefixes that can be added to verbs, Ukrainian verbs have inherited occasional traces of the Indo-European ablaut. The primary ablaut is the difference between long and short Indo-European vowels. In Ukrainian, due to the fact that the long and short vowels experienced different reflexes, this ablaut is reflected as a change in vowels. The resulting verbs are often imperfect-perfect pairs. For example, we have скочити and скакати (simplified Indo-European *skoki- and *skōka-).

Fundamental sentence structure

Coordination 
The common Ukrainian coordinations are:
 і / й / та (and)
 а (and, but)
 але (but)

Subordination 
Common Ukrainian subordinations are:

 як (how, if)
 коли (when)
 якщо (if)

Syntax 
The basic word order, both in conversation and the written language, is subject–verb–object. However, because the relations are marked by inflexion, considerable latitude in word order is allowed, and all the permutations can be used. The word order expresses the logical stress, and the degree of definiteness.

Negation 
Unlike English, Latin, and various other languages, Ukrainian allows multiple negatives, as in nixto nikoly nikomu ničoho ne proščaje 'no-one ever forgives anyone anything', literally 'no-one never to no-one nothing does not forgive'. Single negatives are often grammatically incorrect because when negation is used in complex sentences every part that could be grammatically negated should be negative.

Objects of a negated verb are placed in the genitive case, where they would be accusative if the verb were not negated.

Inflectional usage

Case 
The use of cases in Ukrainian can be very complicated. In general, the nominative, genitive, accusative, and vocative cases can be used without a preposition. On the other hand, the locative and instrumental cases are used primarily with a preposition. Furthermore, and much like in Latin, different prepositions can be followed by nouns in different cases, resulting in different meanings.

Aspect 
Ukrainian verbs can have one of two aspects: imperfective and perfective. The imperfective form denotes an action that is taking place in the present, is ongoing, is repetitive, or is habitual. The perfective form indicates an action that is completed, is the result of an action, is the beginning of an action, or is shorter or longer than usual. For example, spaty (спати) is imperfective, while pospaty (поспати) is perfective.

See also 
 Ukrainian language
 Ukrainian alphabet
 Ukrainian orthography
 Ukrainian name
 Ukrainian phonology

Abbreviations used in this article 
Note: All Common Slavic words quoted are translated faithfully by their Ukrainian forms. Abbreviations used:
 m: masculine noun
 f: feminine noun
 nt: neuter noun
 n: noun declined like an adjective, with different forms for each gender
 v: verb
 adj: adjective
 adv: adverb
 ger: gerund
 pr: pronoun
 co: conjunction

References

External links 
 Ukrainian Grammar http://ukrainiangrammar.com/
 Rules of Ukrainian grammar (with friendly search-engine) http://www.pravopys.net
 Guide to Ukrainian grammar (not always on line) http://ulif.org.ua/ulp/dict_all/index.php?key_reestr=53915&dict=paradigm
 Guide to Ukrainian orthography http://rozum.org.ua/index.php?a=srch&d=21&id_srch=4370e04265734957b6001b0b7608d9cd&il=ru&p=1
 Verb Conjugator http://www.verbix.com/languages/ukrainian.shtml
 Ukrainian Grammar (1946) by P. Kovaliv https://web.archive.org/web/20150616053924/http://www.mova.club/ukrainian/

 
Ukrainian language